Euthyas is a genus of mites belonging to the family Thyasidae.

The species of this genus are found in Europe and Northern America.

Species:
 Euthyas elephantula Gerecke, 1996
 Euthyas truncata (Neuman, 1874)

References

Trombidiformes
Trombidiformes genera